Elaver excepta is a species of sac spider in the family Clubionidae. It is found in North America and the Caribbean.

References

Clubionidae
Articles created by Qbugbot
Spiders described in 1866